Princess Eugénie may refer to:

 Princess Eugénie of Greece and Denmark (1910–1989), daughter of Prince George of Greece and Denmark
 Princess Eugénie of Sweden (1830–1889), daughter of King Oscar I

See also 
 Princess Eugenie (born 1990), member of the British royal family